Catherine Zeta-Jones is a Welsh actress. Her first stage appearance was at age nine as one of the orphan girls in a West End production of the musical Annie. She also played the title role in another production of the musical at the Swansea Grand Theatre in 1981. As a teenager, she played roles in the West End productions of Bugsy Malone and The Pajama Game, following which she had her stage breakthrough with the lead role of a chorus girl turned star in a 1987 production of 42nd Street.

The French-Italian fantasy feature 1001 Nights (1990) marked Zeta-Jones' film debut. She gained popularity in Britain with the role of a country girl in the television series The Darling Buds of May (1991–93)the most watched series in the country at that time. However, disillusioned at only being offered roles of the love interest, Zeta-Jones shifted base to Los Angeles. She achieved early success by playing roles that relied significantly on her sex appeal, in the action film The Mask of Zorro (1998) and the caper thriller  Entrapment (1999). The former earned her a Saturn Award for Best Actress nomination. Zeta-Jones' portrayal of a drug lord's wife in Steven Soderbergh's Traffic (2000) gained her a Golden Globe Award for Best Supporting Actress nomination. She then won an Academy Award and a BAFTA Award for Best Supporting Actress for playing Velma Kelly in the musical Chicago (2002). As the highest-paid British actresses in Hollywood at the time, she took on the parts of a serial divorcée in Intolerable Cruelty (2003), a flight attendant in The Terminal (2004) and a Europol agent in Ocean's Twelve (2004). A sequel to The Mask of Zorro, entitled The Legend of Zorro (2005), was a failure, following which Zeta-Jones played an ambitious chef in the romantic comedy No Reservations (2007).

Zeta-Jones significantly decreased her workload in the late 2000s. She made her Broadway debut in 2009 with the role of an ageing actress in the musical A Little Night Music, which won her the Tony Award for Best Actress. After a three-year absence from the screen, she had three film releases each in 2012 and 2013. None of her releases in 2012 performed well. This changed in 2013, when she played a mysterious psychiatrist in Soderbergh's critically acclaimed thriller Side Effects and a Russian agent in the action film Red 2. After another three-year sabbatical, Zeta-Jones starred in the British film Dad's Army (2016), based on the television sitcom of the same name. In 2017, she returned to television by portraying the actress Olivia de Havilland in the anthology series Feud. She has since appeared in the television series Prodigal Son (2021) and Wednesday (2022).

Screen credits

Film

Television

Stage roles

Awards and nominations

Footnotes

References

External links
 
 

Actress filmographies
Lists of awards received by British actor
British filmographies